Madhray is a small village near Phalia city of Mandi Bahauddin District, Punjab, Pakistan.

Government Islamia Millet High School for Boys, established in early 70s, is a famous progressive school in Madhray. The village also hosts the Government High School for Girls.

This village has a moderate climate, hot in summer and cold in winter. The winter months are mild and the minimum temperature may fall below .

References

Union councils of Mandi Bahauddin District
Villages in Phalia Tehsil
Villages in Mandi Bahauddin District